Ladislaus III (also spelled as Vladislav III or Władysław III) may refer to:

 Ladislaus III of Hungary (1201–1205), Arpad king
 Władysław III Spindleshanks (1165–1231), Duke of Poland
 Władysław III of Poland (1424–1444), Polish name Władysław III Warneńczyk, also king of Hungary, known posthumously as Władysław III of Varna
 Vladislaus II of Bohemia and Hungary (1456–1516), Jagiellon ruler who was sometimes referred to as Vladislav III of Bohemia
 Vladislav III of Wallachia, Prince of Wallachia (d. 1525)

See also 
 Władysław III of Poland (disambiguation)
 Ladislaus (disambiguation)